Iraj Azizpour is an Iranian heavyweight kickboxer. He is the former Kunlun Fight heavyweight kickboxing champion, and was ranked among the top 10 kickboxers in the world in 2018 by Liver Kick, as well as being ranked in the top ten by Combat Press between March 2018 and March 2019.

Kickboxing career
In 2017 he participated in the International Federation of Muaythai Associations Amateur Championships. He won a silver medal, and was voted the Best Male Prospect in Muay Thai.

Kunlun Fight
Iraj Azizpour participated in the Kunlun Fight 2017 heavyweight tournament. In the quarter final round he faced Ye Xiang. He won the fight by unanimous decision. He faced Asihati in the semifinals and won the fight in the second round, by way of KO. Advancing to the finals he fought Roman Kryklia for 2017 Kunlun Fight Heavyweight Tournament title. Iraj won a majority decision.

He next fought Olivier Thompson under the MAS Fights banner. Iraj won the fight by TKO, earning a $40,000 finish bonus as well.

In the 2019 Kunlun Fight 8-man Heavyweight Tournament, Azizpour lost in the quarterfinals to Brazilian Haime Morais. However due to an injury Morais was unable to fight in the semifinals and Azizpour advanced to the semifinals as his replacement, where he defeated the Chinese fighter Asihati. Azizpour lost in the finals to Roman Kryklia.

Iraj Azizpour was next scheduled to fight for the interim FEA Heavyweight title against Pavel Zhuravlev. Azizpour was replaced by Mehmet Ozer.

ONE Championship 
On October 15, 2021, it was announced that Azizpour was scheduled to face Roman Kryklia in a trilogy fight for the inaugural ONE Heavyweight Kickboxing World Championship at ONE Championship: NextGen on October 29, 2021. After Kryklia withdrew from the fight due to a medical issue, Azizpour faced Anderson Silva in a non-title fight. He won the fight by unanimous decision.

Azizpour was booked to face the 2012 K-1 Grand Prix runner-up Ismael Londt at ONE: Lights Out on March 11, 2022. After weathering an early storm in the first storm, Azizpour won the fight by second-round knockout.

ONE Kickboxing Heavyweight Grand Prix
Azizpour faced Bruno Chaves in the semifinals of the ONE Kickboxing Heavyweight Grand Prix at ONE 161 on September 29, 2022. He won the fight by unanimous decision.

Azizpour faced Roman Kryklia in the ONE Kickboxing Heavyweight Grand Prix finals, which were held at ONE 163 on November 18, 2022. It was the third time that the pair faced each other, with each holding a win over the other. Despite knocking Kyrklia down in the first round, he lost the fight by a second-round knockout.

Championships and accomplishments

Muay Thai
IFMA
2017 IFMA 91+kg Silver medal 
2017 IFMA Best Male Prospect

Kickboxing
ONE Championship
2022 ONE Heavyweight Kickboxing World Grand Prix Tournament Runner-Up
2022 Kickboxing Fight of the Year 
Kunlun Fight
2017 Kunlun Fight Heavyweight Tournament Winner

Boxing
Siege of Abadan
2017 Super heavyweight Tournament Winner

Fight record

|-  style="text-align=center; background:#FFBBBB;"
| 2022-11-19|| Loss ||align=left| Roman Kryklia || ONE 163, Tournament Final || Kallang, Singapore || TKO (punches) || 2 || 1:28 || 19–6 
|-
! style=background:white colspan=9 |
|-
|- style="background:#CCFFCC;"
| 2022-09-29 || Win || align="left" | Bruno Chaves || ONE 161, Tournament Semifinal || Kallang, Singapore || Decision (unanimous) || 3 || 3:00 ||19–5
|-
|-  style="text-align=center; background:#CCFFCC;"
| 2022-03-11|| Win ||align=left| Ismael Londt || ONE: Lights Out || Kallang, Singapore || KO (punches) || 2 || 2:01 || 18–5 
|-  style="text-align=center; background:#CCFFCC;"
| 2021-10-29 || Win ||align=left| Anderson Silva || ONE Championship: NextGen || Kallang, Singapore || Decision (Unanimous) || 3 || 3:00 || 17–5
|-
|-  bgcolor="#FFBBBB"
|2019-02-24
|Loss
|align=left| Roman Kryklia
|Kunlun Fight 80 – Heavyweight Tournament Final
|Shanghai, China
|Decision (Unanimous)
|3
|3:00
|16–5
|-  bgcolor="#CCFFCC"
|2019-02-24
|Win
|align=left| Asihati
|Kunlun Fight 80 – Heavyweight Tournament Semifinal
|Shanghai, China
|KO (punches)
|3
|3:00
|16–4
|-  bgcolor="#FFBBBB"
|2019-02-24
|Loss
|align=left| Haime Morais
|Kunlun Fight 80 - Heavyweight Tournament  Quarterfinal
|Shanghai, China
|Decision (split)
|3
|3:00
|15–4
|-
|-  bgcolor="#CCFFCC"
|2018-11-12
|Win
|align=left| Olivier Thompson
|MAS Fight
|Macau, China
|KO
|3
|N/A
|15–3
|-  bgcolor="#CCFFCC"
|2018-02-04
|Win
|align=left| Roman Kryklia
|Kunlun Fight 69 – Heavyweight Tournament Final
|Guiyang, China
|Decision (Majority)
|4
|3:00
|14–3
|-
! style=background:white colspan=9 |
|-
|-  bgcolor="#CCFFCC"
|2018-02-04
|Win
|align=left| Asihati
|Kunlun Fight 69 – Heavyweight Tournament Semifinal
|Guiyang, China
|KO
|2
|N/A
|13–3
|-  bgcolor="#CCFFCC"
|2017-12-17
|Win
|align=left| Ye Xiang
|Kunlun Fight 68 – Heavyweight Tournament Quarterfinal
|Zunyi, China
|Decision (Unanimous)
|3
|3:00
|12–3
|-
| colspan=9 | Legend:    

|-  bgcolor="#FFBBBB"
| 2017-05-12|| Loss||align=left| Tsotne Rogava || IFMA World Championship 2017, Final || Minsk, Belarus || Decision  || 3 || 3:00 
|-
! style=background:white colspan=9 |

|-  style="background:#cfc;"
| 2017-05-10|| Win||align=left| Andrey Gerasimchuk || IFMA World Championship 2017, Semi Final || Minsk, Belarus || KO  || 3 || 3:00 

|-  style="background:#cfc;"
| 2017-05-07|| Win||align=left| Semen Shelepov || IFMA World Championship 2017, Quarter Final || Minsk, Belarus || Decision (Unanimous) || 3 || 3:00 

|-  style="background:#fbb;"
| 2011-09-22|| Loss ||align=left| Sebastien Van Thielen || IFMA World Championships 2011 || Tashkent, Uzbekistan || Decision || 4 || 2:00
|-
| colspan=9 | Legend:

See also
 List of male kickboxers

References 

1988 births
Kunlun Fight kickboxers
ONE Championship kickboxers
Iranian male kickboxers
Living people
Sportspeople from Tehran
Kunlun Fight kickboxing champions